The canton of Bonneville is an administrative division of the Haute-Savoie department, southeastern France. Its borders were modified at the French canton reorganisation which came into effect in March 2015. Its seat is in Bonneville.

It consists of the following communes:

Arenthon
Ayse
Bonneville
Brizon
Contamine-sur-Arve
Faucigny
Fillinges
Glières-Val-de-Borne
Marcellaz
Marignier
Mégevette
Onnion
Peillonnex
Saint-Jean-de-Tholome
Saint-Jeoire
Saint-Pierre-en-Faucigny
La Tour
Ville-en-Sallaz
Viuz-en-Sallaz
Vougy

References

Cantons of Haute-Savoie